The 2001 UCI Road World Championships took place in Lisbon, Portugal, from 9 to 14 October 2001. The event consisted of a road race and a time trial for men, women, men under 23, junior men and junior women.

Events summary

External links 
Course profiles, live coverage, results and history @ cyclingnews.com

 
UCI Road World Championships by year
W
C
C